Acryptolaria elegans is a species of hydrozoan in the family Lafoeidae. It is found in the Gulf of Mexico.

References

External links 

 
 Acryptolaria elegans at WoRMS

Animals described in 1877
Lafoeidae
Biota of the Gulf of Mexico